El Musical de tus Sueños was an alternate Argentine season of Bailando por un Sueño. In place of the traditional format of couples, each celebrity danced, sang and acted with a team of 5 dancers and one professional dancer. Each week they had to portray a different theme (love, fantasy, etc.). The elimination format was the same as in the traditional competition: each week the worst couples were eliminated, the jury retained some of them, and in the finale the last two remaining went to the public vote.

The first show of the season  aired on August 24, 2009 as part of the original show, Showmatch, broadcast on El Trece and hosted by Marcelo Tinelli. 22 teams competed over a period of 18 weeks. The winner was revealed on the season finale, on December 17, 2009:  the dancer and model Silvina Escudero.

The panel of judges were the model, actress and vedette Graciela Alfano, the director and choreographer Aníbal Pachano, actress and dancer Reina Reech, and the singer Valeria Lynch.

Contestants 

  Nazarena Velez left the competition, and Rocío Marengo entered in her place.
  María Vazquez left the competition, and Eunice Castro entered in her place.
Winners of the re-entry (round 14):
Matías Alé.
Adabel Guerrero (replacing Wanda Nara).
Ricardo Fort (replacing María Vazquez).

Scoring chart

Tití Fernandez and Silvina Luna were sentenced because they stopped their routines in the middle of the choreography, as they forgot it. Silvina was saved by the judges (week 9), but Tití was eliminated (week 10).
In weeks 16 and 17, all the teams danced as they were in a sentence, so there were no scores. In week 16 they danced Cumbia, and in week 17 Merengue. The safe couples in week 17, were the semifinalists.

Red numbers indicate the lowest score for each week.
Green numbers indicate the highest score for each week.
 indicates the couple eliminated that week.
 indicates the returning couple was saved by the judges.
 indicates the returning couple was the last to be called safe and finished in the bottom two.
 indicates the couple that withdrew.
 indicates the winning couple.
 indicates the runner-up couple.
 indicates the semifinalists couples.

  replaced by Victoria Onetto.
  replaced by Vanina Escudero.

Highest and lowest scoring performances 
The best and worst performances in each dance according to the judges' marks are as follows:

Styles, scores and songs
Secret vote is in bold text.

August

September

October

November

Re-entry

December

Duel

Semifinal and Final

External links
 Official show site

Musical
Argentine variety television shows
2009 Argentine television seasons